A kurgan is a tumulus or burial mound in Eurasia.

Kurgan may also refer to:

Places in Russia
 Kurgan, Kurgan Oblast, a city
 Kurgan Airport
 Kurgan West, a former nearby airbase
 Kurgan Oblast, a federal subject of Russia

Other uses
 Kurgan hypothesis, one of the proposals about early Indo-European origins
 The Kurgan, the villain in the movie Highlander
 The Kurgan, a fictional human culture in Warhammer Fantasy (setting), aligned to the Chaos faction
 Kurgan cattle, a breed of cattle that originates from Russia
 Lukasz Kurgan, bioinformatician

See also
 Kurrgan, ring name of Robert Maillet (born 1969), Canadian actor and retired wrestler
 Kurgansky (disambiguation)
 Tumulus (disambiguation)